Faithful Satellite is the seventeenth studio album by Australian blues rock band, The Black Sorrows. The album was initially released on CD and digital download on September 16, 2016; followed by a limited-edition double vinyl followed on September 30, 2016. The vinyl included eight tracks exclusively.

Reception
In a review for Stack Magazine, Jeff Jenkins wrote "Faithful Satellite traverses bluegrass, blues, rockabilly, reggae, rock, gospel, and soul. 'Camilleri' is known for the vitality in his lyrics".

Paul Cashmere, reviewing the album for Noise11, stated that the album is a 'masterpiece', adding that "The Faithful Satellite's beauty is in its diversity with rock, jazz, bluegrass, and country woven through the release. This often reminds long-time Camilleri fans of the various eras of Black Sorrows music across the last 30 years."

Track listing

Digital download
 "I Love You Anyhow"
 "Raise Your Hands"
 "It Ain't Ever Gonna Happen"
 "Land of the Dead"
 "Cold Grey Moon"
 "Fix My Bail"
 "Carolina"
 "You Were Never Mine"
 "Winter Rose"
 "Love Is On Its Way"
 "Beat Nightmare"
 "Into Twilight"

Charts

Faithful Satellite Tour
The group toured the album across Australia throughout the second half of 2016.

 29 July – The Flying Saucer Club, Victoria
 30 July – Bundy Hall, Victoria
 31 July – Bundy Hall, Victoria
 20 August – The Satellite Lounge, Victoria
 1 September – Southport Yacht Club, Queensland
 2 September – "Red Fest" Brisbane, Queensland
 3 September – Towers Rocks, Queensland
 4 September – Sunshine Beach Surf Club, Queensland 
 10 September – Sandstone Point Hotel, Queensland 
 16 September – SS&A Club, Albury, NSW
 17 September – The Palms at Crown, Melbourne, Victoria   (with special guests Vika and Linda Bull)
 22 September – Mt Pleasant Tavern, Queensland 
 23 September – Dalrymple Hotel, Townsville, Queensland 
 24 September – Edge Hill Tavern, Cairns, Queensland 
 29 September – Devonport Entertainment & Convention Centre, Tasmania
 30 September – Country Club Showroom, Tasmania
 1 October – Centre Square, Birrarung Marr, Victoria
 7 October – Twin Towns Services Club, NSW
 9 October – Barwon Club Hotel, Victoria
 12 October – Frankston RSL, Victoria
 13 October – Friends Restaurant, Perth, WA
 14 October – Fly by Night Club, Fremantle, WA
 15 October – Charles Hotel, WA
 16 October – Ravenswood Hotel, WA
 21 October – Wild Goose Restaurant, WA

 22 October – Shark Bay 1616, WA
 29 October – Cygnet Town Hall, Tasmania
 30 October – Republic Bar, Hobart, Tasmania
 3 November – The Basement, Sydney, NSW
 4 November – Inland Sea of Sound Festival, Bathurst, NSW
 5 November – Armidale Ex-Services Club, NSW
 6 November – Hoey Moey Beer Garden, Coffs Harbour, NSW
 8 November – Bird's Basement, Melbourne, Victoria
 9 November – Bird's Basement, Melbourne, Victoria
 11 November – Caboolture Sports Club, Queensland
 12 November – Stanthorpe Rocks, Queensland
 13 November – Caloundra Power Boat Club, Queensland
 18 November – Governor Hindmarsh Hotel, Adelaide, SA
 19 November – River Rockfest, Broken Hill, NSW
 26 November – River Rockfest, Mildura, Victoria
 2 December – The Grand Hotel, Mornington, Victoria
 3 December – Lakeside Twilights, Ballarat, Victoria
 3 December – River Rockfest, Swan Hill, Victoria
 4 December – Halls Gap Hotel, Victoria
 7 December – Centro CBD, Wollongong, NSW
 8 December – The Basement, Canberra, ACT
 9 December – Lizotte's Newcastle, NSW 
 10 December – Lizotte's, Newcastle, NSW
 11 December – Camelot Lounge, Marrickville, NSW
 17 December – Skycity, Darwin, NT

Personnel
The Black Sorrows
 Joe Camilleri (vocals/guitar/saxophone)
 Claude Carranza (guitar/vocals)
 Mark Gray (bass/vocals)
 John McAll (keyboards/vocals) 
 Angus Burchall (drums)

Release history

References

2016 albums
Albums produced by Joe Camilleri
The Black Sorrows albums